Smyslovye Gallyutsinatsii is a Russian rock band which has won the Golden Gramophone award twice.

The name of the band may be translated as "meaningful hallucinations" or "semantic hallucinations." This is not a medical term; it was produced as a slip of the tongue and stuck. The band is also known under a much shorter name "Glyuki", a slang term, which means basically the same: glitches in your brain.

Biography
The band was formed in Sverdlovsk in 1989. In 1990, they became part of the Sverdlovsk rock club, and they were the last group accepted to it before the club was closed down.

For a decade the group had many problems, split a few times, and had problems getting a contract.

Their breakthrough came in 2000 when two of their songs, Rozovye Ochki (Rose Colored Glasses) and Vechno Molodoy (Forever Young) were featured on the soundtrack of the Brother 2 movie. During this year the band also released their debut album, 3000.

In 2001, the band released their second album, Lyod 9 (Ice 9). Two songs from the album, Zachem Toptat' Moyu Liubov (Why Tread Upon My Love) and Razum Kogda-Nibud' Pobedit (Reason Will Triumph Someday) received the most prestigious Russian musical award, the Golden Gramophone.

In 2003, the band released the Obratnaya Storona Zemli (The Other Side of the Earth) album. The album was a success and in 2004 the band was nominated for the Ovation award as the band of the year.

In 2004, the band released a greatest hits compilation, called 66 Rus.

In 2005, the fourth album of the band, Bolshiye Plany (Big Plans) was released. After that album the band was designated the "band of the year" by the Maximum radio station.

In 2008 the band released a new album, Serdtsa i Motory (Hearts and Engines), with the song Nastoyashiye Geroi (Real Heroes) from the album being released to the internet earlier.

Discography
3000 (2000)
Lyod 9 (Ice 9, 2001)
Obratnaya Storona Zemli (The Other Side of the Earth, 2003)
66 Rus (2004) (compilation)
Bolshiye Plany (Big Plans, 2005)
Serdtsa i Motory (Hearts and Engines, 2008)
Sdelano v Temnote (Made in the Darkness, 2011)

Participation in collections
''Budzma! Tuzin. Perazagruzka-2 (2011), track “Апошні дзень Зямлі”

References

External links
Official website 
Russmus info on Gluki, including lyrics and translations

Russian rock music groups
Musical groups from Yekaterinburg
Musical groups established in 1989
Soviet rock music groups
Winners of the Golden Gramophone Award